Hunterstown is an unincorporated community and census-designated place in Straban Township, Adams County, Pennsylvania, United States. As of the 2020 census, the population was 506.

The Hunterstown Historic District and Great Conewago Presbyterian Church are listed on the National Register of Historic Places.

History

During the Battle of Gettysburg in 1863, there was a brief cavalry skirmish at Hunterstown, today known as the Battle of Hunterstown.

Demographics

References

External links
Hunterstown Historical Society

Unincorporated communities in Pennsylvania
Census-designated places in Adams County, Pennsylvania
Census-designated places in Pennsylvania
Unincorporated communities in Adams County, Pennsylvania